Dhalbhumgarh Airport (IATA: none, ICAO: none) is a proposed domestic airport, which will serve the city of Jamshedpur, Jharkhand, India. The Government of Jharkhand and the Airports Authority of India (AAI) signed a Memorandum of Understanding (MoU) for the construction of the airport on 24 January 2019. Under the MoU, a joint venture company would be set up to construct the airport. The project was initially expected to be completed by December 2020. Due to delays and the COVID-19 pandemic, the airport was expected to open by 2022, but construction had not started yet. However, In December 2022, land acquisition for a 3.5 km link road connecting to the airport has started.

The construction of the airport is expected to start once it receives necessary forest clearance from the Forest Department of the State Government, which is still under progress. Once completed, it will become the main airport for Jamshedpur and adjoining regions, by replacing the existing Sonari Airport.

History 
The former airfield was built in 1942, during World War II, as an ancillary runway for other airfields in the vicinity that were being built around India's eastern frontier as part of the war effort. It was one of the airfields used by allied forces to repel the advancing Japanese troops and to maintain transport links with China. As the Japanese forces came to control shipping in the South China Sea, seaborne supply routes to China were cut, and the difficult,  route over the Himalayas, was increasingly used. The airfield was abandoned after the war. Currently, there are two Runways vis 01/19 with dimensions 1741 m x 45 m & 13/31 with dimensions 1771 m x45 m. The surface of runway is not suitable for operations. No other facility are available at the airport.

The airport was to have 3 km long runway. The AAI had planned to invest ₹ 300 crores  for the new airport and the state was to provide 300 acres of land for the project. The then Chief Minister of Jharkhand, Raghubar Das, performed the ground breaking ceremony of the airport project on 24 January 2019 and the Government signed the MoU with the AAI on the same day. Under the MoU, a joint venture company would be set up to construct the airport, in which AAI would have a 51 percent stake, while the State Government would own the remaining. According to the memorandum, AAI would invest ₹ 100 crores to construct the airport while the State would provide the land required for the project. It will built in two phases. The first phase will have an area of 240 acres and the runway of 1,745 metres along with a terminal building, an Air Traffic Control (ATC) tower, Fire Station and a terminal building will be built. The runway will handle ATR-72 type aircraft. The terminal building, measuring 15,000 square feet, will have six check-in counters and will be able to handle 150 passengers during peak hours. The runway will be extended to 2,179 metres to handle Airbus A320 and Boeing 737 type aircraft as part of the first phase. In the second phase, an additional 545 acres would be acquired to increase the runway length to operate larger aircraft, along with the expansion of the terminal to handle more traffic. The runway will be expanded to 4,400 metres, making it capable for handling Airbus A380 and Boeing 747 type aircraft.

Project timeline 

 June 2017 : The technical team of the Airports Authority of India (AAI) scouted the region for a suitable location for an airport for Jamshedpur and visited Chakulia and Dhalbhumgarh. After considering all factors, the team chose the Dhalbhumgarh site for the airport. The AAI decided to invest ₹ 100 crores to construct the airport while the State would provide the land required for the project. It will built in two phases.
 September 2017 : The Ministry of Defence had staked its claim over more than half of the airport project land that was owned by the government. 
 September 2018 : The Ministry of Defence gave clearance to the Ministry of Civil Aviation for the construction of the proposed airport.
 January 2019 : The then Chief Minister of Jharkhand, Raghubar Das, and the Minister of State (Civil Aviation), Jayant Sinha and Jamshedpur MP, Bidyut Baran Mahato, performed the groundbreaking ceremony of the airport project on 24 January 2019, and the Government of Jharkhand signed the MoU with the AAI on the same day.
 December 2019 : On 26th December, the Expert Appraisal Committee (EAC) under the Ministry of Environment, Forest and Climate Change suggested that creation of an airport at a site nearer to Jamshedpur will be better for the people of the city, by at first, knowing the site's pros and cons before starting construction. However, the EAC after detailed deliberation upon the proposal asked the project proponent (AAI) to submit a revised pre-feasibility study report, as well as in view of the foregoing observations, the EAC recommended to defer the proposal for the construction of an airport. The proposal shall be reconsidered after the revised pre-feasibility study report is submitted to the committee.
 August 2022 : Site Inspection of the proposed airport was conducted from 22nd March 2022 to 10th June 2022, and since the airport will be an infrastructure along the National Highway, it can boost the economies of Ghatsila, Musabani and Chakulia. Therefore, the proposal may be implemented in the wider interest of the population living around the site.
 December 2022 : Land acquisition for a 3.5 km link road connecting to the airport started.
 January 2023 : The airport project has hit a roadblock with the forest department, which did not accept to give a No Objection Certificate (NOC) necessary for its construction, because the former airfield lies in a deep forest area known as the Elephant Corridor, and if the airport is built, it may affect and harm the environment in the region.
 March 2023 : The AAI has decided to the dissolution of the Dhalbhumgarh Airport Limited and sent letter to the Government of Jharkhand for the consent as per the procedure. Response is awaited from the State Government in this regard.

References

Airports in Jharkhand
Proposed airports in Jharkhand
East Singhbhum district